AT Microscopii is a binary star system located at a distance of  from the Sun in the constellation of Microscopium. Both members are flare stars, meaning they are red dwarf stars that undergo random eruptions that increase their brightness. This pair lies physically near the red dwarf star AU Microscopii, which may mean they form a wide triple star system.

Observational history
In 1926, Dutch-American astronomer Willem Jacob Luyten reported that the lines in the spectrum of this star underwent variation. A photographic plate taken on June 23, 1895, showed bright lines of hydrogen that were much weaker on a plate taken June 29, 1895. A photograph taken on July 1, 1903, showed no such lines. The net variation in brightness of the star was small, not exceeding 0.5 in magnitude. Luyten noted that the star has a large proper motion, changing its position by 0.43 seconds of arc between 1899 and 1923.

By 1927, the object was found to be a pair of stars with an angular separation of 2.95 arcseconds. Both were shown to be of 'dwarf Me' type, indicating they are red dwarfs with emission lines in their spectrum. This was the first such pair of matching dwarf Me stars to be discovered. The first parallax measurements of the pair showed an annual shift of about 0.1 arcseconds, while their radial velocity was measured to be +5 km/s away from the Sun. A nearby star HD 197981, later named AU Microscopii, was shown to have a similar radial velocity of +10 km/s. For this reason it was suggested that the three stars are physically associated.

Following the discovery in 1949 that certain types of variable stars are characterized by rapid but brief changes in brightness, accompanied by emission lines in their spectrum, in 1954 both HD 196982 A and B were listed as suspected flare stars by Czech solar physicist Zdeněk Švestka.

With the introduction of photometric instruments to astronomy, the variability of stars could now be monitored over intervals of time. Measurements of HD 196982 during 1969 showed them to be the most active flare stars known at that time: over a period of 16.31 hours, 54 flares were observed. The flares increased the combined magnitude of the pair by more than 0.05 for more than half of this observation period. By 1972, the pair had received the variable star designation AT Microscopii.

Properties
It is a binary star system with an angular separation of 4.0 arcseconds. Both members are pre-main sequence, red dwarf stars and are among the youngest of this type in the neighborhood of the Sun. Relative to the Sun, component A has about 27% of the mass and 3.6% of the luminosity, while component B has 25% of the mass and 3.3% of the luminosity.

Both members of this system have active stellar coronae, show luminosity variations of the BY Draconis type, and are X-ray emitters. The average flare rate for the pair is 2.8 per hour. Neither star shows any indication of lithium in their spectrum, having depleted this element through nuclear fusion at their cores.

This indicates that the three may form a wide hierarchical triple system, with the AT Microscopii pair orbiting AU Microscopii over a period of 10 million years. All three stars are candidate members of the Beta Pictoris moving group, one of the nearest associations of stars that share a common motion through space. Estimates for the age of this group range between 10 and 21 million years.

References

External links

Microscopium
M-type main-sequence stars
Binary stars
Flare stars
BY Draconis variables
196982
0799
102141
CD-32 16135
Microscopii, AT